Nehru Stadium is a multi-purpose stadium in Tumkur, Karnataka. The ground is mainly used for organizing matches of football and field hockey and also athletics. The stadium hosted one first-class match in 1973 when Karnataka cricket team played against Vidarbha cricket team. but since then the stadium has not hosted any cricket matches.

References

External links 
 cricketarchive
 cricinfo

Cricket grounds in Karnataka
Monuments and memorials to Jawaharlal Nehru
Buildings and structures in Tumkur district
Sports venues completed in 1973
1973 establishments in Karnataka
20th-century architecture in India